Mimetus strinatii is a species of spider of the genus Mimetus. It is endemic to Sri Lanka.

See also
 List of Mimetidae species

References

Mimetidae
Endemic fauna of Sri Lanka
Spiders of Asia
Spiders described in 1972